Thomas Hubert Uphill (June 26, 1874 – February 17, 1962) was a socialist politician in British Columbia, longtime mayor of the town of Fernie and also represented the riding named for the town in the British Columbia Legislative Assembly for forty years, most of them as the legislature's sole labour MLA.

Early life
Uphill was born in 1874 in Chewton Mendip, Somerset, England, the son of a farm labourer. After serving in the Second Boer War, he moved to Fernie, British Columbia in 1904 and became a life insurance salesman. A supporter of the trade union movement he also served as secretary of the miner's union. In 1912 he was elected to city council for the first time and won his first election as mayor in 1915.

Political career
In the 1916 provincial election, Uphill ran for the provincial legislature as a Conservative and was narrowly defeated. The wave of political radicalisation that followed World War I along with his trade union sympathies affected Uphill and when he ran for the legislature in 1920, he did so as a member of the Federated Labour Party which had been created by the province's federation of labour absorbing previous socialist parties. Uphill was elected as one of three FLP MLAs in the province.

In the legislature, Uphill was an opponent of prohibition clashing with Premier John Oliver on the question. In 1924 Uphill was re-elected as one of three Canadian Labour Party MLAs. The CLP fractured and, in 1928, Uphill was re-elected as the sole Independent Labour Party MLA and thereafter represented the local "Fernie and District Labour Party". The British Columbia Co-operative Commonwealth Federation contested its first election in 1933. Uphill declined to join the CCF, viewing it as too conservative. His views had evolved towards those of the Communist Party of Canada though he never joined that party nor ran under its label.

The 1952 provincial election resulted in a hung parliament in which no party had a majority. The new British Columbia Social Credit League had won 19 seats, only one more than the CCF, led by Harold Winch. The CCF argued that they ought to be called upon to form a government as, with Uphill as a labour MLA, the left had as many seats as Social Credit and that, with much more parliamentary experience than the Socreds, they were better positioned to form a government. The CCF, however, had run candidates against Uphill in the 1949 and 1952 elections. In 1949, Uphill beat the Liberal-Conservative coalition candidate by only nine votes, the narrowness of the victory due to vote-splitting by the CCF. W.A.C. Bennett had foreseen the CCF's argument and obtained Uphill's agreement that he would instead support Social Credit's bid to form the government. By the time Social Credit was defeated in a motion of no confidence the next year, Uphill had changed his mind and pledged to support a CCF government.  However, Harold Winch was unable to convince Lieutenant-Governor Clarence Wallace to give his party a chance to form a government and so the legislature was dissolved and a 1953 early election was called resulting in a Social Credit majority government.

Uphill remained the sole small-l labour MLA in the legislature until his retirement in 1960.
He would make appearances and make speeches at events such as May Day organized by the Communists and later the Labor-Progressive Party.

Uphill remained mayor of Fernie until he lost a close election in 1946 but managed to return to the office in 1950. He retired from the office in 1955 due to health reasons, though he remained in the provincial legislature for an additional term.

When he died in 1962, 22 flags flew at half-mast to mourn his passing. A new affordable living facility for seniors and people with disabilities (Tom Uphill Manor) was named in his honor.

References

The Cold War and Working Class Politics in the Coal Mining Communities of the Crowsnest Pass, 1945-1958 examines the political situation in the Crowsnest Pass with a focus on the Labor-Progressive Party, the CCF, and Tom Uphill.
"Tom Uphill Manor", BC province press release for ministries including housing and Interior Health, December 1, 2006.  Retrieved March 9, 2007.

Canadian socialists
Members of the Legislative Assembly of British Columbia
Mayors of places in British Columbia
British Columbia Conservative Party politicians
Canadian Labour Party politicians
1962 deaths
1874 births
British emigrants to Canada